Dorcheh (also Romanized as Dorcheh, Darcheh, and Dorcheh) is a city in the Central District of Khomeyni Shahr County, Isfahan Province, Iran. At the 2016 census, its population was 47,800, in 15,411 families.

Sports activities index
Dorcheh Establishment of cycling in 2006  www.dctg.ir

References

Cities in Isfahan Province
Populated places in Isfahan County